Samastipur Junction railway station (station code: SPJ), is a railway station serving the city of Samastipur in the Samastipur district in the Indian state of Bihar. The Samastipur Junction railway station, is well connected to most of the major cities in India by the railway network and serves the city with numerous trains. Samastipur station is well connected to Patna, Muzaffarpur, Hajipur, Delhi, Mumbai, Kolkata, Howrah, Bangalore, Udaipur, Jaipur, Kanpur, Guwahati, Surat, Lucknow, Chennai, Amritsar, Ahmedabad, Ranchi, Dhanbad, Gwalior and other major cities. It is also the originating station for many express trains.

Facilities 
The major facilities available are waiting rooms, a retiring room, computerised reservation facility, a reservation counter and vehicle parking etc. The vehicles are allowed to enter the station premises. There are refreshment rooms with vegetarian and non-vegetarian food items, a tea stall, book stall, post and telegraphic office and Government Railway Police (G.R.P.) office. Automatic ticket vending machines have been installed to reduce the queue for train tickets at the station. The station is also equipped with free Wi-Fi. The station also has recently been equipped with lifts at both ends of the station.

Platforms
There are seven platforms at Samastipur Junction. The platforms are interconnected with two foot overbridges (FOB). Platform 3,4 and 5 are the busiest platforms and are mostly used for long-haul trains.

References

External links

Railway stations in Samastipur district
Railway junction stations in Bihar
Samastipur railway division
Transport in Samastipur